Aviation High School may refer to:

In Australia 
Aviation State High School, Clayfield, Queensland

In the United States 
Aviation High School (California), Redondo Beach, California
Aviation Career & Technical Education High School, New York City, New York
Raisbeck Aviation High School, Tukwila, Washington